The 1922 Toledo Maroons season was their inaugural season in the National Football League. The team finished 5–2–2, finishing fourth in the league.

Schedule

Standings

References

Toledo Maroons seasons
Toledo Maroons
Toledo